Juncal is a civil parish in the municipality of Porto de Mós, Portugal. The population in 2011 was 3,316, in an area of 26.64 km2.

References

Parishes of Porto de Mós